Bilikiss Adebiyi or Bilikiss Adebiyi-Abiola is a Nigerian entrepreneur who founded the Lagos-based recycling company 'Wecyclers'. She is currently the Director General of the Lagos State Records and Archives Bureau (LASRAB) and Managing Director of the Lagos State Parks and Gardens Agency (LASPARK).   She is also a member of the Board of Trustees of the Lagos State Employment Trust Fund.

Early life
Adebiyi was born in Lagos, where she went to the Supreme Education Foundation secondary school. She entered the University of Lagos, but she left after a year to complete her studies in America. She graduated from Fisk University and then went to Vanderbilt University, where she earned a master's degree. She worked for IBM for five years before deciding to study further. She was accepted to study for a Master of Business Administration (MBA) at the Massachusetts Institute of Technology (MIT).

Wecyclers 

She came up with the idea of a recycling business during her second year at MIT, where she worked on waste as her specialist subject. Her initial idea was to increase the quantity of waste she could collect from households by offering them raffle tickets in exchange. When she discussed this in Nigeria on a vacation she was surprised at the enthusiasm that was offered for her ideas. Waste is a particular nuisance in Lagos as only a small percentage is collected regularly. Adebiyi took the idea back to MIT where she was able to gather support by entering her idea in competitions. After graduation in 2012, Adebiyi moved back to Nigeria to be with her husband. 

In 2012, she co-founded Wecyclers, a company that collects recyclable rubbish from households in Lagos. When the business started, Adebiyi would take out a tricycle to do collections to find out more about her new business. Once the rubbish is sorted, her company sends SMS back to the household, informing them of how many points they have earned for trading in the rubbish. These points could be converted for food, cleaning products, or cellphone minutes. The company works in partnership with the Lagos Waste Management Authority. Lagos produces 9,000 tons of waste per day and the authority were trying to double the proportion that was recycled from the 18% figure in 2011. Nigeria economy is one of the biggest economy in Africa but the disorganization in Lagos means the rubbish cannot always be collected. Wecyclers uses modified tricycles which enables the rubbish to be collected where normal vehicles could not reach. Wecyclers collects the rubbish from thousands of households. The company's estimate in October 2015 is that it has collected over 500 tons of rubbish, it has created value from that rubbish and has employed 80 people.

Adebiyi whose married name is Abiola has arranged for the Coca-Cola and GlaxoSmithKline to subsidizes their operation. Wecyclers had found that a significant proportion of the rubbish came from these companies and they were willing to assist with the recycling effort. Guinness in Nigeria agreed to collaborate with tWecyclers in 2018.

In 2017, Abebiyi stepped down as the CEO of Wecyclers to become the Managing Director of the Lagos State Parks and Gardens Agency (LASPARK).  In her new role, she will be keeping open space in Lagos State attractive and carry out tree planting. She is currently the Director General of Lagos State Records and Archives Bureau (LASRAB).

Recognition
Adebiyi's efforts have been reported in Nigeria and D+C. She has been awarded grants from MIT and she has won a number of awards, including the Cartier Women's Initiative Award for sub-Saharan Africa in 2013. Wecyclers were awarded the King Baudouin International Development Prize in 2018/19.Fela Akinse and Bilikiss Adebiyi-Abiola were the only two Nigerians listed in Africa among top 5 waste recycling Entrepreneur in Africa.

Partners 
Wecycler's  partners includes FCMB, DHL, Unilever, Oracle, Nigerian Bottling Company and MIT Sloan School of Management.

References

Businesspeople from Lagos
Fisk University alumni
Vanderbilt University alumni
MIT Sloan School of Management alumni
Recycling industry
Nigerian women company founders
Women chief executives
University of Lagos alumni
21st-century Nigerian businesswomen
21st-century Nigerian businesspeople
Nigerian nonprofit businesspeople
Nigerian expatriates in the United States
Living people
Year of birth missing (living people)